Bozieni is a commune in Neamț County, Western Moldavia, Romania. It is composed of five villages: Băneasa, Bozieni, Crăiești, Cuci and Iucșa.

References

Communes in Neamț County
Localities in Western Moldavia